Rhampholeon uluguruensis, the Uluguru pygmy chameleon, is a small species of chameleon endemic to Tanzania.

References

Rhampholeon
Reptiles of Tanzania
Endemic fauna of Tanzania
Reptiles described in 1996
Taxa named by Colin R. Tilbury